Ely Galleani (born  24 April 1953), sometimes credited as Justine Gall and Ely Gall, is a retired Italian film actress.

Born in Alassio as Federica Elisabetta De Galleani, daughter of an Italian count and of a Polish woman of Lithuanian origin, Galleani made her film debut in 1970 with a small role in Quella piccola differenza by Duccio Tessari, then appeared in a number of films with roles of more weight. Drug problems and a decline in Italian film production forced her to retire from acting in 1978. She moved on to a career as an accountant.

She was the half-sister of actress Halina Zalewska, who accidentally died in 1976, at 36, in a fire. Galleani is also the ex-wife of Italian filmmaker Carlo Vanzina.

Selected filmography

 Quella piccola differenza (1970)
 The Swinging Confessors (1970)
 Five Dolls for an August Moon (1970)
 In the Name of the Italian People (1971)
 A Lizard in a Woman's Skin (1971)
 Roma Bene (1971)
 High Crime (1973)
 Redneck (1973)
 Sedicianni (1973)
 Baba Yaga (1973)
 La prova d'amore (1974)
 The Devil Is a Woman (1974)
 Mark Shoots First (1975)
 Naked Massacre (1976)
 The Big Operator (1976)
 Emanuelle in Bangkok (1976)
 Black Cobra Woman (1976)
 La dottoressa sotto il lenzuolo (1976)
 Apache Woman (1976)
 Nero veneziano (1978)
 Emanuelle and the White Slave Trade (1978)

References

External links 
 
 Official site

Italian film actresses
1953 births
People from Alassio
Italian television actresses
Living people